USS Hopi (AT-71) was a  constructed for the United States Navy during World War II. Her purpose was to aid ships, usually by towing, on the high seas or in combat or post-combat areas, plus "other duties as assigned." During World War II she was assigned to the Europe-Africa-Middle East Theater where she participated in four campaigns earning four battle stars.

Description

Hopi was laid down 5 May 1942 by Charleston Shipbuilding and Drydock Co., Charleston, South Carolina and launched on 7 September 1942. She was commissioned 31 March 1943.

World War II service
After shakedown training in Key West the Hopi left for New York and then was deployed with a convoy for North Africa on 10 June 1943 to join the Europe-Africa-Middle East Theater.

Sicilian occupation
Upon arrival she was tasked with performing towing services for several days before steaming to Bizerte to join Vice Admiral Hewitt's Western Naval Task Force for the assault on Sicily. Departing Bizerte 8 July with pontoons in tow, Hopi landed them 2 days later and immediately set to work clearing the beaches of damaged landing craft and fighting fires on vessels in the transport areas.

Salerno landings
She returned to Bizerte 10 August to prepare for the Salerno operation. She sailed early in September and again performed salvage work. On 11 September, while lying-to in the support area awaiting calls for support, received a direct hit on No. 3 turret which left her dead in the water. Hopi and salvage tug  immediately came alongside. Work by these two tugs allowed  to return to Malta that under her own power. On 16 September,  took multiple hits from guided bombs. Hopi and Moreno were able to tow her to Malta without further incident.

References

External links 
 

 

Cherokee-class fleet tugs
World War II auxiliary ships of the United States
Ships built in Charleston, South Carolina
1942 ships
Cherokee-class fleet tugs of the Republic of China Navy